Lary Evrard Yannick (born 10 December 1982), known as Lary, is a former Gabonese footballer who played as a forward.

International career
Lary made his debut on 7 September 2002 in a 1–0 African Cup of Nations qualifying loss against Morocco in Libreville.

On 29 March 2003, Lary scored a brace for the national team in a 4–0 victory over Equatorial Guinea at Stade d'Angondjé in Libreville.

International goals
Scores and results list Gabon's goal tally first.

References

External links
 
 

1982 births
Living people
Sportspeople from Libreville
Gabonese footballers
Association football forwards
FC 105 Libreville players
Primeira Liga players
Gil Vicente F.C. players
Liga Portugal 2 players
F.C. Marco players
FK Makedonija Gjorče Petrov players
Gabon international footballers
Expatriate footballers in Portugal
Expatriate footballers in North Macedonia
21st-century Gabonese people